In geometry, the semidiameter or semi-diameter of a set of points may be one half of its  diameter; or, sometimes, one half of its extent along a particular direction.

Special cases
The semi-diameter of a sphere, circle, or interval is the same thing as its radius — namely, any line segment from the center to its boundary. 

The semi-diameters of a non-circular ellipse are the halves of its extents along the two axes of symmetry.  They are the parameters a, b of the implicit equation

Likewise, the semi-diameters of an ellipsoid are the parameters a, b, and c of its implicit equation

The semi-diameters of a superellipse, superellipsoid, or superquadric can be identified in the same way.

See also 
 Semi-major and semi-minor axes
 Semiperimeter

Geometric measurement